Lowe Art Museum is the art museum of the University of Miami in Coral Gables, Florida. The museum is located on the campus of the University of Miami and is accessible by Miami Metrorail at University Station.

Lowe Art Museum's  comprehensive collection comprises more than 19,250 objects, which collectively represent more than 5,000 years of human creativity on every inhabited continent. The collection is divided into 14 thematic rooms with each room dedicated to a theme or artistic current in the collection. In addition to its 14 rooms, the museum includes Palley Pavilion, which is dedicated to the museum's glass collection, and an outdoor garden, which includes contemporary art sculptures.

History
Lowe Art Museum at the University of Miami opened on February 22, 1950. The museum was originally established by a gift from philanthropists Joe and Emily Lowe. At the time of its opening, the museum was the first art museum in South Florida. 

In 1951, Miami philanthropists Joe and Emily Lowe underwrote construction of a stand-alone facility on the University of Miami campus to absorb the gallery's rapidly growing collections. The new Lowe Art Gallery was dedicated on February 4, 1952. Four years later, in 1956, Alfred I. Barton donated his extensive collection of Native American art to Lowe, which was accommodated in a 1,300 square-foot purpose-built addition.

In 1961, Lowe Art Gallery was selected as a repository for 43 works from the Samuel H. Kress Collection of European Renaissance and Baroque art, which was housed in a new wing built specifically for it. 

In 1968, Lowe Art Gallery was renamed the Lowe Art Museum. In 1972, it was the first museum in Miami-Dade County to be professionally accredited by American Alliance of Museums.

In 1985, Lowe was recognized by the State of Florida as a major cultural institution, the first museum in Miami-Dade County to receive this designation. 

In 1991, as a result of Lowe's continued art acquisitions (primarily through gift acceptances), the museum underwent a major expansion. Miami architect Charles Harrison Pawley was selected for this project, which added 13,000 additional square feet of temporary and permanent exhibition gallery space to the museum, bringing its total footprint to over 36,000 square feet. This expansion also addressed Lowe's need for new HVAC, security, and fire protection systems.

Holdings

The museum has an extensive collection of art with permanent collections in Greco-Roman antiquities, Renaissance, Baroque, 17th- and 19th-century European art, 19th-century American Art, and modern art. The museum's national and international works come from Latin America, Africa, Asia, Native America, Ancient Americas, and Pacific Islands. It also has a large collection of glassworks including creations by Robert Arneson, Jun Kaneko ("Dango") and Christine Federighi ("Globe"). There are also glassworks by Pablo Picasso, William Morris, Emily Brock, Harvey Littleton, Erwin Eisch, and Ginny Ruffner in its permanent collection.

The permanent collection includes works by: Lippo Vanni, Sano di Pietro, Lorenzo di Bicci, Lorenzo di Credi, Vincenzo Catena, Francesco Bacchiacca, Bernardino Fungai, Adrian Isenbrandt, Jacob Jordaens, Jusepe de Ribera, El Greco, Francisco Goya, Thomas Gainsborough, Paul Gauguin, Claude Monet, Alfred Sisley, Frank Stella, Knox Martin, and Duane Hanson. There are also Modern works of Art by Roy Lichtenstein, Sandy Skoglund, Purvis Young, Louise Nevelson, Julian Stanczak, and Enrique Montenegro in the permanent collection.

The museum's most recent expansion, the Myrna and Sheldon Palley Pavilion for Contemporary Glass and Studio Arts, opened in 2008 and added another 4,500 square feet of exhibition space. The museum's collections also include pieces ranging from classical archeology to contemporary art, with important pieces of Renaissance, Baroque, Asian, and Native American art.

Greek and Roman antiquities
Sylvia and Ray Marchman, Jr. Gallery

This gallery includes pottery, sculpture, metalwork, and glasswork from ancient Ancient Greece and the Roman Empire, dating from the first millennium BCE through the 4th century CE. The antiquities on view are complemented by Washington Allston's mural-sized, neoclassical painting Jason Returning to Demand His Father's Kingdom (1807-1808).

Renaissance and Baroque arts 
Samuel H. Kress, Palley Gallery and Sheila Natasha Simrod Friedman Gallery 

Here you will find Western European Medieval, Renaissance, and Baroque paintings, sculptures, and decorative art objects including work from the Samuel H. Kress Collection of Renaissance and Baroque art. This wing was built specifically to house the Kress Collection after Lowe was selected as a repository for 41 works in 1961.

Arts of Africa
The Potamkin Family Gallery

This gallery offers works from all regions of the African continent with an emphasis on the Sub-Saharan Africa region. Works include architectural elements, ceremonial and ritual objects, costumes, textiles, and sculptures dating from ca. 500 BCE to the present. In addition, there are ceramic, stone, metal, and paper objects from Egypt, the Near East, and Western Asia.

Arts of Asia
Sol and Sheila Taplin Gallery

Here you will find ceramics, metalwork, sculpture, costumes, textiles, and architectural elements dating from the Neolithic period through the present from China, Japan, Korea, India, and Southeast Asia.

Indigenous art of the Americas
Alfred I. Barton Wing

This gallery, which is dimly lit to preserve its contents, hosts pottery, basketry, sculpture, costumes, and textiles of Native North, Central, and South America. Works on view span from the period of 2500 BCE to contemporary works by living Native artists.

Contemporary and modern art
Ben Tobin Galleries

The long gallery is dedicated to contemporary artwork that is globally influenced and culturally diverse. Contemporary art, produced in the second half of the 20th century or in the 21st century, combines materials, methods, concepts, and subjects that continue to challenge boundaries. Diverse and eclectic, this work is a part of a cultural dialogue that concerns larger contextual frameworks such as personal and cultural identity, politics, community, and nationality.

Contemporary glass and ceramics
Myrna and Sheldon Palley Pavillion and Pat and Larry Stewart Hall, Beaux Arts Bay and Matus Bay

The Myrna and Sheldon Palley Pavilion for Contemporary Glass and Studio Arts and houses over 100 objects from Lowe's glass collection as well as ceramics. Palley Pavilion opened on May 1, 2008 thanks to the vision of long-time University supporters and alumni, Sheldon and Myrna Palley, whose collection is a promised gift.

Renaissance and Baroque
Francesco da Rimini (also called Master of the Blessed Clare)
  Adoration of the Magi, c. 1340 

Francesco Guardi (attr.)
  View of the church of Santa Maria della Salute c. 1750

Jacopo Robusti known as Tintoretto
  Portrait of a young man  c. second half of 16th century 

Vincenzo Catena
  Portrait of Giambattista Memmo  c. 1510 

Lucas Cranach the Elder
  Portrait of a scholar  c. 1515 ca.

Lippo Vanni
  Madonna and Child Enthroned with Donors and Saints Dominic and Elizabeth of Hungary  c. 1343

Jacob Jordaens
  The oath of Paris  c. 1620–1625 

Adriaen Isenbrandt
  Madonna with child and member of the Hillensberger family  1513

Giuseppe Maria Crespi
  Lady with dog  c. 1690–1700 

Lorenzo di Credi
  Madonna and Child  c. 1500 

Andrea del Sarto
  Madonna with child and San Giovannino  c. 1429 

Antonio da Correggio (attr.)
  Portrait of a young woman  c. 1515 

Ambrogio Bergognone
  Madonna and Child  1520 ca.

17th to 20th century American and European art
Jusepe de Ribera
  Sant' Onofrio c. 1642 
  St. Peter  

Dominikos Theotokopoulos known as El Greco
  Christ Carrying the Cross  
  Feast in the House of Simon  

Bartolomé Esteban Murillo
  Portrait of a Gentleman  

Thomas Gainsborough
  Portrait of Mrs. Collins  c. 1770–1775 

Francisco José de Goya y Lucientes
  Jose Antonio, Marques de Caballero  1807 

Paul Gauguin
  Le Chaland et la barque  1882

Claude Monet
 Waterloo Bridge 1903

Albert Bierstadt
  Yosemite Valley, California  c. 1863

André Masson
  Mistral 

Fernando Botero
  Las Frutas  1964

Carlos Alfonzo
  Lifetime [Curso de la Vida]  1988

José Bedia
  Nkunia, Gajo or Rama  1995

Contemporary 

Roy Lichtenstein
 Modular Painting in Four Panels V  1969

Frank Stella
 Le Neveu de Rameau 1974

Duane Hanson
 Football Player 1981

Deborah Butterfield
 Rex 1991

Tatiana Parcero
 Interior Cartography # 43 1996

Sandy Skoglund
 Breathing Glass, Installation, 2000

References

External links
Official website

Museums in Miami-Dade County, Florida
University of Miami
Art museums and galleries in Florida
University museums in Florida
Buildings and structures in Coral Gables, Florida
Art museums established in 1950
1950 establishments in Florida
Asian art museums in the United States